Oxyna flavipennis is a species of fruit fly in the family Tephritidae.

Distribution
United Kingdom & Scandinavia, South to Italy, Bulgaria & Caucasus.

References

Tephritinae
Insects described in 1844
Diptera of Europe